Cado dalle nubi is a 2009 Italian comedy film directed by Gennaro Nunziante.

Plot 
Checco is a good guy from Polignano a Mare (Apulia), who loves music. He is ignorant and clumsy, and as a result is increasingly ridiculed. When his girlfriend dumps him, Checco decides to go and stay with his cousin in Milan, to seek his fortune in the music business. His cousin comes out as gay, while Checco falls in love with Marika, the daughter of an avid "leghista" (a sympathizer of the Lega Nord) from the separatist state "Padania", who hates Southern Italians.

Cast 
 Checco Zalone - Checco
 Giulia Michelini - Marika
 Dino Abbrescia - Alfredo
 Ivano Marescotti - Marika's Father
 Claudia Penoni - Marika's Mother
 Peppino Mazzotta - Livio
 Stefano Chiodaroli - Giulio
 Gigi Angelillo - Checco's Uncle
 Ludovica Modugno - Checco's Aunt
 Anna Ferruzzo - Pina, Checco's Mother
 Gioia Libardoni - Secretary
 Francesca Chillemi - Luisa

External links 

Films directed by Gennaro Nunziante
2009 comedy films
2009 films
Films set in Apulia
Films set in Milan
Italian comedy films
Films shot in Milan
2000s Italian-language films